Aerenea panamensis is a species of beetle in the family Cerambycidae. It was described by Martins and Galileo in 2010. It is known from Panama.

References

Compsosomatini
Beetles described in 2010